is a public university  in Tsuruga, Fukui, Japan, established in 2014. The campus of the Tsuruga Nursing University is the former campus of Tsuruga College, a private junior college which closed in 2014.

External links
 Official website 

Educational institutions established in 2014
Public universities in Japan
Universities and colleges in Fukui Prefecture
Nursing schools in Japan
Tsuruga, Fukui
2014 establishments in Japan